Los Horóscopos de Durango were a Regional Mexican band. In their first years, they were a grupero band, but they eventually changed to the duranguense style when the genre was becoming mainstream. They eventually switched to banda. In their last years, their live performances were a mixture of the latter two styles. 

The band was started by Armando Terrazas in Chicago in 1975. From 2003 to 2021, it was led by his daughters, Vicky and Marisol Terrazas. 

Some of their achievements include:
Winners of three Billboard Music Awards in 2005:
Regional Mexican Album of the Year
Most air-played song in the "Regional Mexican genre"
Regional Mexican Song of the Year
Winners of two Billboard Awards in 2006:
Regional Mexican Album of the Year
Regional Mexican Song of the Year.
Winners of one Latin Grammy 2007 :
Band Album of the Year ("Desatados")
Winners of one of the Latin Awards delivered by The American Society of Composers, Authors & Publishers (ASCAP) with this same Hernaldo Zúñiga's song:
Best Regional Song 2007
Winners of one award Lo Nuestro 2008:
Duranguense Artist of the Year
Nominated by the Latin Grammy Awards:
Album of the Year 2004
Album of the Year 2005
Nominated in three categories for Premios Que Buena in 2004.
Nominated by Billboard Latin Music Award 2008, the song was ¿Cómo Te Va Mi Amor? by the nicaraguan composer Hernaldo Zúñiga:
Regional Mexican Airplay Song Of The Year, Female Group or Female Solo Artist

In 2007, the band appeared on Dominican singer Anaís' album Con Todo Mi Corazón. They performed her hit single "Sólo Mio" with her on the album.

One of the band’s signature songs, "Antes Muertas que Sencillas", was a cover of Spanish singer María Isabel. She used it as her entry into the Junior Eurovision Song Contest 2004. María Isabel won the contest. She later used it on her first album, named No me Toques las Palmas que me Conozco ("Don't clap Because I Know Myself" suggesting that once she hears clapping she can't help but to sing and dance).

In November 2021, the Terrazas sisters announced on their social media pages that Los Horóscopos de Durango had broken up on good terms. Vicky was retiring to dedicate herself to raising her recently born son, while Marisol would continue her career as a solo artist. Vicky’s retirement was very short-lived because, in March of 2022, she also began her solo career.

Discography
Puras de Rompe y Rasga (2003)
Locos de Amor (2004)
Recordando el "Terre" (2004)
A Tamborazo Limpio (2004)
Con Sabor a Polkas (2005)
Y Seguimos con Duranguense (2005)
En Vivo Gira Mexico (2005)
Antes Muertas Que Sencillas (2006)
Desatados (2006)
Ayer, Hoy y Siempre (2008)
Houston Rodeo Live (2008)
Pura Pasión (2009)
Duda (2009)
La Guera y La Morena (2010)
Viejitas Pero Buenas... Pa' Pistear (2012)
Las Chicas Malas (2013)
Vivir En Pecado (2015)
Entre El Amor y La Aventura (2018)

References

External links
Official website

American duranguense musicians
Latin Grammy Award winners
Musical groups from Chicago
Universal Music Latin Entertainment artists
Duranguense music groups